Indarbela magma is a moth in the family Cossidae. It is found in Vietnam.

References

Metarbelinae
Moths described in 1929